Andy Nelson is a British re-recording mixer and sound engineer working in Los Angeles, California, United States. He has won two Academy Awards for Best Sound and has been nominated 24 times. He has worked on over 150 films since 1980. In addition to the Academy Awards, Nelson has won five BAFTA Award for Best Sound and has been nominated for eight more in the same category. He was awarded the Australian Centenary Medal in the Queen's 2001 New Year Honours List for his services to Australia society and Australian film production.

Accolades
Academy Award

References

External links
 

Year of birth missing (living people)
Living people
British audio engineers
Best Sound Mixing Academy Award winners
Best Sound BAFTA Award winners